John Robert Brown (born November 1887) was an English footballer who played in the Football League for Bristol City and Middlesbrough.

References

1887 births
Year of death missing
English footballers
Association football defenders
English Football League players
South Bank F.C. players
Middlesbrough F.C. players
Bristol City F.C. players